Condon High School is a high school located in Condon, Oregon, United States.

Academics
In 2008, 93% of the school's seniors received their high school diploma. Of 14 students, 13 graduated and 1 dropped out.

Athletics

State championships

 Girls basketball, 1997, 1998, 1999, 2000, 2002, 2014
 Boys basketball, 1987, 1990

References

High schools in Gilliam County, Oregon
Public high schools in Oregon